Below is list of Dutch language exonyms for places in non-Dutch-speaking areas.

Albania

Argentina

Australia

Austria

Azerbaijan

Belgium 

List of Dutch exonyms for places in Belgium

Brazil

Canada

Chile

Czechia

Denmark

Egypt

Finland

France

Germany

Greece

Hungary

Israel

Italy

Lebanon

New Zealand

Norway

Poland

Portugal

Romania

Russia

Serbia

Spain

Sweden

Switzerland

Turkey

Ukraine

United Kingdom

United States 

Except for California and Hawaii, These Dutch-language place names were used during the Dutch colonial period and are now obsolete, and the Dutch spelling shown is in the modern Dutch spelling; at the time Dutch spelling varied.

See also
List of European exonyms
Afrikaans exonyms

Exonym
Lists of exonyms